Elhadj Oumar Traoré is a Guinean politician. As of 2009 he was the regional president of the Nzérékoré Region of Guinea in the south-east.

External links
Official Government of Guinea site

Guinean politicians
Living people
Year of birth missing (living people)
Place of birth missing (living people)
21st-century Guinean people